Decree number 2004/320 is a presidential decree issued on December 8, 2004 by Paul Biya that organized 29 ministries of the Government of Cameroon.

Provisions

Provisions of the decree include:
Creation of the Ministry of Youth Affairs.
Splitting the Ministry of Environment and Forests into the Ministry of Forests and Fauna and the Ministry of Environment and Protection of Nature.
Reorganisation of the Ministry of Energy and Water.
Creation of the Ministry of Small and Medium-Sized Enterprises, Social Economy and Handicraft.
Transfer of responsibility for authorisation of the use of government vehicles from the Prime Minister's Office to the Ministry of State Property and Land Tenure.

References

External links
Text of the decree (in French)

Government of Cameroon
2004 320